Roger Chanoine Jr. (September 11, 1976 – July 14, 2016) was a professional American football player who was an offensive tackle in the National Football League (NFL) between 1998 and 2002, appearing primarily for the Cleveland Browns.

Biography
Chanoine played on the offensive line with the Temple University football team between 1994 and 1997. He went undrafted after college and he joined the St. Louis Rams as a free agent in 1998. He signed with the Cleveland Browns the next year. Of his 18 career games started, 16 of them came in the 2001 season, when he was the right tackle for the Browns. He split the 2002 season between the Browns and the Jacksonville Jaguars.

After his professional football days, Chanoine remained in the Cleveland area,  and he was a sales manager with Konica Minolta. He died on July 14, 2016 of pancreatic cancer. He was survived by his wife and five children.

References 

1976 births
2016 deaths
Players of American football from Newark, New Jersey
American football offensive tackles
Temple Owls football players
St. Louis Rams players
Cleveland Browns players
Jacksonville Jaguars players
Deaths from pancreatic cancer
Deaths from cancer in Ohio